María Encarnación Valenzuela Conthe (born 1945), better known as Curry or Curri Valenzuela, is a Spanish journalist and writer.

Biography

During the Transition she was editor-in-chief of Cambio 16, and between 1982 and 1986 she was with EFE, in both cases in the National section.

Between 1986 and 1992, Valenzuela was political editor of the magazine Tiempo. Beginning in 1996 she was administrative director of Radio Televisión Española, nominated by the Popular Party, and more specifically its president José María Aznar. She has contributed independently to several media outlets.

From 2004 to 2010 she directed and presented Telemadrid's talk show Alto y Claro.

In 2009, FHM chose Valenzuela as the sexiest and most serious journalist on Spanish television.

Since September 2011 she has written for the talk show Con el mundo a cuestas, which is directed and presented by journalist  on channel .

Since September 2014 she has also been a panelist on the program , which is presented by journalist Inés Ballester on La 1.

She was married to journalist .

Works
Curri Valenzuela has written four books to date.
 100 personajes que hunden España (2007)
 Sola (2008)
 Los culpables de la crisis (2009)
 Yo no me quiero jubilar (2012)

References

External links
 

1945 births
Living people
People from Málaga
Spanish political commentators
Spanish television presenters
Spanish women journalists
Spanish women television presenters